The First Secretary of State is an office that is sometimes held by a minister of the Crown in the Government of the United Kingdom. The office indicates seniority, including over all other Secretaries of State. The office is not always in use, so there have sometimes been extended gaps between successive holders. 

The office is currently vacant, having most recently been held by Dominic Raab between July 2019 and September 2021.

Constitutional position 
Like the Deputy Prime Minister, the First Secretary enjoys no right of automatic succession to the office of Prime Minister. However, when Prime Minister Boris Johnson was moved to an intensive care unit on 6 April 2020 after contracting COVID-19, First Secretary Dominic Raab was asked "to deputise for him where necessary."

The office temporarily enjoyed some greater constitutional footing between when it was incorporated as a corporation sole in 2002 and having all of its remaining functions transferred in 2008. During most of this time, John Prescott was the First Secretary.

History
In 1962, Rab Butler was the first person to be appointed to the office, in part to avoid earlier royal objections to the office of Deputy Prime Minister. The office gave Butler ministerial superiority over the rest of the Cabinet and indicated that he was second-in-command. Harold Wilson appointed three people to the office between 1964 and 1970, but it has been noted by Anthony Seldon et al. that the office may have caught on "...more as an ego-massager than for functional reasons."

Later, Michael Heseltine and John Prescott held the office alongside being Deputy Prime Minister. The two offices have only existed concurrently with different holders in David Cameron's coalition government, wherein Liberal Democrat Leader Nick Clegg was appointed Deputy Prime Minister, while Conservative William Hague was First Secretary.

Responsibilities 
The office is currently listed on the gov.uk website as bringing no additional responsibilities. However, Lord Norton says that there are two benefits to a Prime Minister in appointing a First Secretary: firstly, it leaves a senior minister free to perform correlation and co-ordination and to chair committees and, secondly, it enables the Prime Minister to send a signal as to the status of the holder. Stephen Thornton and Jonathan Kirkup have said that "the Office of First Secretary of State is only as important as the person holding that office is perceived to be important", but in certain circumstances the office "...can assume acute importance and real power" and it may yet become an office of substance.

List of First Secretaries of State

Timeline

See also
Deputy Prime Minister of the United Kingdom

Notes

References

Ministerial offices in the United Kingdom
Honorary titles of the United Kingdom

sv:First Secretary of State